Pirić is a surname. Notable people with the surname include:

Denijal Pirić (born 1946), Bosnian football player
Ivica Pirić (born 1989), Croatian football player
Kenan Pirić (born 1994), Bosnian football player